{{Infobox video game
| title      = Dark Seal
| image      = Darkseal.jpg
| alt        = Japanese arcade flyer with the title "Dark Seal"
| caption    = Japanese arcade flyer
| developer  = Data East
| publisher  = 
| director   = 
| designer   = 
| artist     = 
| programmer = 
| composer   = 
| released   = {{collapsible list
 | title = 1990/1992
 | Arcade (Dark Seal)  Arcade (Dark Seal II) 
 | ZeeboSwitch (Gate of Doom)Switch (Wizard Fire)PS4 (Gate of Doom)Windows (Gate of Doom)Windows (Wizard Fire)PS4 (Wizard Fire) }}
| genre      = Role-playing, beat-'em-up
| modes      = Single-player, multiplayer
| platforms  = Arcade, Zeebo, Nintendo Switch, PlayStation 4, Microsoft Windows
}}
The first game was localized in English under the title Gate of Doom and the second one as Wizard Fire'.

Gameplay

The players control characters from an isometric perspective and must traverse levels while fighting enemies, avoiding traps, and collecting items as well as spells. The game features two-player cooperative play.

Ports
Like multiple other Data East games, the games were ported to the Zeebo by Onan Games and published by G-Mode in Brazil in 2010. Wizard Fire was also included in the 2010 Wii compilation Data East Arcade Classics by Majesco Entertainment.

Then in 2018, FTEGames ported both Gate of Doom and Wizard Fire to the Nintendo Switch's eShop as well as Gate of the Doom to the PlayStation 4 as part of their Johnny Turbo's Arcade series of Data East arcade game ports branded with the character of Johnny Turbo, the Turbo Duo mascot and alter-ego of FTEGames founder Johnny Brandstetter. Ports of both games for Steam, GOG, and Wizard Fire for PS4 were later released in 2021, developed and published by 612 Entertainment and Ziggurat Interactive respectively. FTEGames also lists ports for the Xbox One as under development.

Reception

In Japan, Game Machine listed Dark Seal on their July 15, 1990 issue as being the most-successful table arcade unit of the month. Game Machine also listed Dark Seal II on their June 15, 1992 issue as being the ninth most-successful table arcade unit of the month.

Both games received positive reviews. Leisure Line magazine reviewed the original game and rated it 10+ out of 10. The sequel was considered a noteworthy improvement overall.

Retrospectively, the original arcade games have been unfavorably compared to the side-scrolling RPG beat-'em-up Dungeons & Dragons: Tower of Doom'', which was published by Capcom in 1993.

References

External links

1990 video games
Video game franchises
Data East video games
Arcade video games
Role-playing video games
Beat 'em ups
Marvelous Entertainment franchises
Nintendo Switch games
PlayStation 4 games
Zeebo games
Windows games
Multiplayer and single-player video games
Video games developed in Japan
Data East arcade games
Flying Tiger Entertainment games
Ziggurat Interactive games